Kostadin Varimezov (1918, Rossenovo, Bulgaria-2002) was a famous Bulgarian bagpiper (gaidar). He was born in the village of Rossenovo, Burgas Province. In 1954, he was appointed to the Folk Song Ensemble of Radio Bulgaria. He later set up his own band of folk musicians and toured in over 30 countries.

References
 Bulgarian gaidars
 Нестинарско хоро 

1918 births
2002 deaths
20th-century Bulgarian musicians